The Sri Lanka woodshrike (Tephrodornis affinis ) is a species of bird in the family Vangidae.  It is found on Sri Lanka.  It is sometimes considered a subspecies of the common woodshrike.

References

Rasmussen, P.C., and J.C. Anderton. 2005. Birds of South Asia. The Ripley guide. Volume 2: attributes and status. Smithsonian Institution and Lynx Edicions, Washington D.C. and Barcelona.

Sri Lanka woodshrike
Birds of Sri Lanka
Endemic birds of Sri Lanka
Sri Lanka woodshrike
Sri Lanka woodshrike